The 2005 FIVB Women's Junior Volleyball World Championship was held in Ankara and Istanbul, Turkey from July 23 to 31, 2005. 12 teams participated in the tournament.

Qualification process

Pools composition

Preliminary round

Pool A

|}

|}

Pool B

|}

|}

Final round

5th–8th places

Classification 5th and 8th

|}

Classification 7th

|}

Classification 5th

|}

Championship round

Semifinals

|}

Bronze medal match

|}

Gold medal match

|}

Final standing

Individual awards

MVP:  Jovana Vesović
Best Scorer:  Saori Kimura
Best Spiker:  Yin Meng
Best Blocker:  Adenizia da Silva
Best Server:  Barbara Flores
Best Digger:  Monica De Gennaro
Best Setter:  Wei Qiuyue
Best Receiver:  Silvija Radovic

References

External links
 Official website.

World Championship
Women's U20 Volleyball World Championship
Volleyball
FIVB Volleyball Women's U20 World Championship
2005 in youth sport